Anna Maria Bottini (24 March 1916 – 9 August 2020) was an Italian actress.

Biography
Bottini attended the Accademia dei Filodrammatici in Milan, where she graduated in 1936, beginning her acting career at the end of World War II. A character actress, with biting and tasty jokes and with an aggressive attitude, Bottini worked in dozens of films, also collaborating with directors such as Luchino Visconti, for whom she starred in The Leopard. Bottini abandoned the film activity in the early 1980s, devoting herself exclusively to the theatre.

Death
Bottini died on 9 August 2020, at the age of 104.

Partial filmography

The Sons of the Marquis Lucera (1938)
Altura (1949)
 Songs in the Streets (1950)
La paura fa 90 (1951)
Abbiamo vinto! (1951)
The Walk (1953)
Angels of Darkness (1953)
The Law (1959)
The Overtaxed (1959)
The Leopard (1963)
The Swindlers (1963)
A Monster and a Half (1964)
Rugantino (1973)

References

External links
 

1916 births
2020 deaths
Actresses from Milan
Italian film actresses
Italian stage actresses
Italian radio personalities
Italian television actresses
20th-century Italian actresses
Italian centenarians
Women centenarians